Ravi Naidoo (born 12 August 1964) is the founder of Interactive Africa and Design Indaba, an annual three day design conference hosted in Cape Town, South Africa, as well as a suite of events such as Design Commons and antenna. Naidoo is also a co-founder of the Cape Innovation and Tech Initiative (CiTi) and Rain, Africa's first 5G network.

Career 
Ravi Naidoo is the recipient of the 2015 Sir Misha Black Medal for innovation in design education. The founder of Interactive Africa, a Cape Town-based media and project management company responsible for the First African in Space mission with Mark Shuttleworth in 2002, and the marketing bid to host the 2010 Fifa World Cup.

In 2008, Naidoo launched a social impact design project through Design Indaba called the 10x10 Housing Project. The project created 10 low-cost houses in Freedom Park in the Cape Flats. The buildings were made using sustainable materials such as sandbags.

Naidoo has a B.Sc. (Hons) degree in Physiology from the University of Cape Town and completed an MBA at the UCT GSB in 1994.

Naidoo is a recognised thought leader and speaker in the field of creativity and design. He sits on the jury of the INDEX Design Awards in Copenhagen. In Amsterdam, he sits on the advisory board of THNK, and is the Chairman of the 2017 IXDA Awards

In 2017 Ravi commissioned the Arch for Arch project, a tribute to Archbishop Desmond Tutu that was constructed in the City of Cape Town. Naidoo, in the same year, cofounded Design Commons with World Design Weeks founder Kari Korkman. Design Commons is known as a deconstructed design conference. In 2016, Naidoo co-founded Rain, a South African data network, with Michael Jordaan and Paul Harris. Naidoo was awarded the Design Prize in 2017, a design prize dedicated to design culture.

In 2019, Ravi served as the Chair of the annual YPO Edge Conference. YPO is the premier global leadership organisation for more than 27,000 chief executives in over 130 countries and the global platform for them to engage, learn and grow.

The YPO EDGE conference is YPO’s largest flagship event, where each year, business leaders from around the world gather to hear luminaries in their respective fields tune in to the global zeitgeist; addressing key issues in business, politics, science, technology, philanthropy and the humanities. the 2019 event took place at the CTICC in Cape Town on 6 and 7 March. Over 2,500 members from around the world gathered to reconnect and learn from the most profound minds of our time.

References

External links 

 Design Indaba – online publication
 An interview with Ravi Naidoo by GOOD Magazine. 
 Ravi Naidoo interviewed for the Radio702 podcast.
Design Indaba Profile
 Interactive Africa

Living people
People from Cape Town
1964 births